The following is a list of winners of the Golden Calf for best actor/actress at the Nederlands Film Festival. From 2021 onwards the award became a gender-neutral award.

Best Actor (1981–2020) 
 1981 - Rutger Hauer - All his works
 1982 - Rijk de Gooyer - All his works
 1983 - Vic Moeremans as farmer Vermeulen - De Vlasschaard
 1984 - Gerard Thoolen as Ben Martens and the father - De Mannetjesmaker and De Illusionist
 1985 - Peter Tuinman as Wiebren Hogerhuis - De Dream
 1986 - John Kraaykamp as Cor Takes - De Aanslag
 1987 - Willem Nijholt as Havinck - Havinck
 1988 - Michiel Romeijn as Harrie de Bruijn - Van Geluk Gesproken
 1989 - Pierre Bokma as Nico - Leedvermaak
 1990 - Thom Hoffman as Frits van Egters - De Avonden
 1991 - Porgy Franssen as Paul - Bij Nader Inzien
 1992 - Rudolf Lucieer as the hunter - De Noorderlingen
 1993 - Rik Launspach as Erik ter Brug - Oeroeg
 1994 - Jaap Spijkers as Harry - 1000 Rozen
 1995 - Rijk de Gooyer as Willem 'Uli' Bouwmeester - Hoogste Tijd
 1996 - Peer Mascini as Pom - Blind Date
 1997 - Jaap van Donselaar as Theo van Hoesel - De Tranen Van Castro
 1998 - Johan Leysen as Felice Beato - Felice...Felice...
 1999 - Rijk de Gooyer as Grandfather - Scratches in the Table
 2000 - Victor Löw as Jack - Lek
 2001 - Fedja van Huêt as Alex/Aram - AmnesiA
 2002 - Jacob Derwig as Nino - Zus & Zo
 2003 - Tygo Gernandt as Maikel Verheije - Van God Los
 2004 - Cees Geel as Simon Cohen - Simon
 2005 - Thijs Römer as Jim de Booy - 06/05
 2006 - Frank Lammers as Dennis van der Horst - Nachtrit
 2007 - Marcel Hensema as Koos van Dijk - Wild Romance
 2008 - Robert de Hoog as Frankie - Skin
 2009 - Martijn Lakemeier as Michiel van Beusekom - Oorlogswinter
 2010 - Barry Atsma as Stijn - Stricken
 2011 - Nasrdin Dchar as Nadir - Rabat
 2012 - Reinout Scholten van Aschat as Rem Hubrechts - The Heineken Kidnapping
 2013 - Marwan Kenzari as Majid - Wolf
 2014 - Gijs Naber as Thijs - How To Avoid Everything
 2015 - Martijn Fischer as André Hazes - Bloed, zweet & tranen
 2016 - Isaka Sawadogo as Yaya - The Paradise Suite
 2017 - Peter Paul Muller as Bram Fischer - Bram Fischer
 2018 - Jacob Derwig as Gijs van Hall - The Resistance Banker
 2019 - Marcel Musters as Thomas - God Only Knows
 2020 - Shahine El-Hamus as Samir - The Promise of Pisa

 Best Actress (1981–2020) 
 1981 - Marja Kok as Aaltje Botter - Het Teken Van Het Beest
 1983 - Carolien van de Berg - Vroeger Kon Je Lachen
 1984 - Monique van de Ven as Anna - all her works/De Schorpioen
 1985 - Renée Soutendijk as Trudi - all her works/De IJssalon
 1986 - Geert de Jong as Danny Gisberts - Mama Is Boos
 1987 - Jasperina de Jong as Inez - Vroeger Is Dood
 1988 - Marijke Veugelers as Eva and Karin de Bruijn - Ei/Van Geluk Gesproken
 1989 - Annet Nieuwenhuijzen as Riet - Leedvermaak
 1990 - Monique van de Ven as Anne Herden - Romeo
 1991 - Loes Wouterson as Henriette  - Bij Nader Inzien
 1992 - Janneque Draisma as Stephanie - Kyodai Makes the Big Time
 1993 - Els Dottermans as Monita - Beck, De Gesloten Kamer
 1994 - Marieke Heebink as Gina - 1000 Rozen
 1995 - Willeke van Ammelrooy as Antonia - Antonia
 1996 - Renée Fokker as Katja - Blind Date
 1997 - Maartje Nevejan, Adelheid Roosen, Marnie Blok, Leonoor Pauw, Lieneke le Roux as Leen, Carlos, Ted, Muis and Lian - Broos
 1998 - Monic Hendrickx as Anna Krzyzanowska - De Poolse Bruid
 1999 - Nadja Hüpscher as Noor - De Boekverfilming
 2000 - Willeke van Ammelrooy as Madam Lauwereyssen - Lijmen/Het Been
 2001 - Monic Hendrickx as Nienke van Hichtum - Nynke
 2002 - Carice van Houten as Minoes - Minoes
 2003 - Kim van Kooten as Phileine - Phileine Zegt Sorry
 2004 - Monic Hendrickx as Martje Portegies - Het Zuiden
 2005 - Maria Kraakman as Anna - Guernsey
 2006 - Carice van Houten as Rachel Stein/Ellis de Vries - Zwartboek
 2007 - Elsie de Brauw as Roos - Tussenstand
 2008 - Anneke Blok as Anne - Tiramisu
 2009 - Rifka Lodeizen as Marieke - Can Go Through Skin
 2010 - Carice van Houten as Lea - De gelukkige huisvrouw
 2011 - Carice van Houten as Ingrid Jonker - Black Butterflies
 2012 - Hannah Hoekstra as Hemel - Hemel
 2013 - Hadewych Minis as Marina - Borgman
 2014 - Abbey Hoes as Nena - Nena
 2015 - Georgina Verbaan as Anne de Koning - The Surprise
 2016 - Hannah Hoekstra as Tiny - The Fury
 2017 - Nora El Koussour as Layla - Layla M.
 2018 - Maria Kraakman as Lin - In Blue
 2019 - Melody Klaver as Kimmy- Rafaël
 2020 - Beppie Melissen as Stine Rasmussen - Romy's Salon

Best Leading Role (Since 2021)
 2021 - Fedja van Huêt as Bas Haan in The Judgement
 2022 - Thekla Reuten as Merel'' in Narcosis

Sources
 Golden Calf Awards (Dutch)
 NFF Website

References

Best Leading Role
Film awards for lead actor
Film awards for lead actress